Thomas M. "Hoke" Holcomb (born September 14, 1945) is a former member of the Michigan House of Representatives and retired Secondary School Teacher.

Early life
Holcomb was born on September 14, 1945, in Charlotte, Michigan. He graduated from Sexton High School in Lansing, Michigan and was involved in school politics and the baseball and tennis teams. As a young teenager, he worked as a retail associate for his fathers clothing store (Davis Clothing) in downtown Lansing, Michigan. Many state legislators would frequent the store to purchase suits and accessories, and it was there Holcomb, through his interactions assisting elected officials, he was introduced to public policy and government. He attended the University of Miami and earned his undergraduate degree in Political Science and minored in History.

Career
In 1972, and just turned 27 years old, Holcomb ran for office and was defeated as the Democratic candidate for the Michigan House of Representatives seat representing the 58th district. He re-engineered his campaign strategies and covered 35 miles on foot walking the county and interacting with voters. His most effective campaign marketing slogan, “Have a Coke on Hoke.” Went viral at county fairs, as he handed out coca-cola soft drinks to potential voters. On November 5, 1974, at 29 years old, Holcomb was elected to the Michigan House of Representatives where he represented the 58th district from January 8, 1975 to 1978. On April 1, 1978, he married Suzanne M. Holcomb (Spence) and had 250 people attend his wedding, which was locally televised. Rep. Holcomb was a young, very involved elected official with grass roots involvement and was praised for his contributions to state and local education, agricultural development and local unions. However, he was not re-elected in 1978. In 1980, Holcomb was a delegate to Democratic National Convention from Michigan, proving he still desired to represent Michigan voters vying for a shot at the State Senate. However, In 1982, Holcomb was defeated as the Democratic candidate for the Michigan Senate seat representing the 20th district. A huge blow to his drive, yet Holcomb stated “my family is what is important, I will take this time to enjoy my beautiful wife and help raise 3 wonderful boys. I will always be involved in politics in some way. But this is a moment for me to reflect on what is most important, and that is my family.”

Holcomb, moved his family to Mason, Michigan, 15 miles south of Lansing. There he ran for city council and remained very close to the Ingham County Fair board and former city Administrator Patrick Price as well as manage the campaign initiatives of former Registrar of Deeds, Paula Johnson. He continued his career as a school teacher with Mason High School and also helped at-risk students in a newly created position within the school district. In 2000, he ran again for the 58th District Michigan House of Representatives, but was defeated.

References

Living people
1945 births
Democratic Party members of the Michigan House of Representatives
20th-century American politicians